The men's 50 over cricket tournament at the 2017 Southeast Asian Games took place at Kinrara Oval in Selangor from 17 to 24 August 2017. The competition was held in a round-robin format, where the top three teams were medal winners.

Competition schedule
The following was the competition schedule for the men's 50 over competitions:

Results
All times used are Malaysia Standard Time (UTC+08:00)

Round-robin

Updated to matches played on 24 August 2017. Source: ESPNCricInfo

References

Men's 50 over tournament